Hanneke Smabers (born October 19, 1973 in The Hague, South Holland) is a former field hockey midfielder from the Netherlands, who played 126 international matches for the Dutch National Women's Team, in which she scored twelve goals. She made her debut on July 3, 1993 against Germany (0-2), and was a member of the team, that won the bronze medal at the 2000 Summer Olympics. Her younger sister Minke also played international hockey for the Dutch Women's Team.

External links
 
 Dutch Hockey Federation

1973 births
Field hockey players at the 2000 Summer Olympics
Dutch female field hockey players
Living people
Olympic field hockey players of the Netherlands
Olympic bronze medalists for the Netherlands
Field hockey players from The Hague
Olympic medalists in field hockey
Medalists at the 2000 Summer Olympics